Brookville Local Schools is a public school district in Brookville, Ohio, United States. Brookville Local School District is known for its outstanding schooling. It serves in Perry Township, Ohio, Clay Township Ohio, and Brookville, Ohio. The mascot of Brookville Local Schools is the Blue Devil.

Brookville High School
Westbrook Elementary School
Brookville Intermediate School

External links
Official Site

Education in Montgomery County, Ohio
School districts in Ohio
Local School District